Gerald R. Nagel (May 18, 1928 – February 2, 1999) was an American professional basketball player. Nagel was selected in the fourth round in the 1949 BAA Draft by the Fort Wayne Pistons. He played for the Pistons in 1949–50 before ending his NBA career after one season.

Career statistics

NBA
Source

Regular season

References

External links
 Stats @ Basketball-reference.com

1928 births
1999 deaths
American men's basketball players
Basketball players from Chicago
Fort Wayne Pistons draft picks
Fort Wayne Pistons players
Guards (basketball)
Loyola Ramblers men's basketball players